Simon Cheong Sae Peng (born ) is a Singaporean businessman. He was ranked by Forbes as the 44th richest man in Singapore in 2016. He is the founder of the property developer SC Global Developments Company. Cheong was ranked the 22nd richest man in Singapore on Forbes' list in 2008 and had a net worth of US$245 million then.

Career
Cheong was instrumental in putting Singapore on the world map for property development. He was also a contributor to Singapore's property industry before the global recession in 2008.

Cheong has a BS degree in Civil Engineering from the University of Washington and a Master of Business Administration from George Washington University. He held several key positions in Citibank and Credit Suisse First Boston prior to setting up SC Global in 1996. He also owns 41% of Australia's housing developer, AV Jennings.

In 1999, Cheong bought MPH Group but sold it in 2002 to Malaysian businessman Syed Mokhtar Al-Bukhary.

Cheong was first elected as president of the Real Estate Developers Association of Singapore (REDAS) in 2007. In early 2009, he was re-elected as president of REDAS, to serve another two-year term for the association.

Personal life

References

1950s births
Living people
Real estate and property developers
Year of birth missing (living people)
Singaporean real estate businesspeople